Dulo Ram is an Indian politician. He was member of the Bharatiya Janata Party. Ram was a member of the Himachal Pradesh Legislative Assembly from the Baijnath constituency in Kangra district. Later, he joined Himachal Lokhit Party ahead of 2012 Himachal Pradesh Legislative Assembly election.

References 

People from Kangra district
Bharatiya Janata Party politicians from Himachal Pradesh
Himachal Pradesh MLAs 1990–1992
Living people
21st-century Indian politicians
Himachal Lokhit Party politicians
Year of birth missing (living people)
Himachal Pradesh MLAs 1998–2003